The Death of the West: How Dying Populations and Immigrant Invasions Imperil Our Country and Civilization is a 2001 book by paleoconservative commentator Patrick J. Buchanan, in which the author argues that western culture is dying and will soon be imperiled.

Summary 
The title of the book is a reference to Oswald Spengler's Decline of the West. Buchanan argues that the culture that produced western civilization as traditionally understood is in its death throes in the United States which will no longer be a western country by the year 2050. He uses United Nations population statistics to analyze the recent trends in global populations, especially major declines in European nations and major increases in Asia, Africa, and Latin America. 

Buchanan argues that the United States has a "nation within a nation" already. The population of 30 million foreign born (of which 11 million are "illegal aliens") is larger than the entire population of Rhode Island, Massachusetts, and Connecticut. 

Buchanan argues that "counter culture" of the 1960s has become the dominant culture, which aims to rewrite American history and dismantle its heritage. In his opinion, this is a hostile culture which regards western civilization with antipathy: "A new generation has now grown up for whom the cultural revolution is not a revolution at all, but the culture they were born into and have known all their lives." He sees the new culture as being intolerant towards those of differing beliefs and determined to impose political correctness.

Buchanan argues that the decline of the Christian faith is the primary cause of low birth rates, hopelessness, and political utopianism. He cites examples of anti-Christian sentiment such as the negative reactions to Catholic films and the triumphant attitude of secularism. According to Buchanan, "Western Man has decided he can disobey God without consequence and become his own God." And at the same time: "The new hedonism seems unable to give people a reason to go on living." He depicts the United States as a country divided between the old culture and the new, with little contact or debate between two diametrically opposed systems of thought.

Reception

Kirkus Reviews called it "[s]hameless, embarrassing rantings" and also remarked that "[l]ittle attests to the moral health of this nation more than the fact that it’s made a mockery of Buchanan's presidential ambitions time and again." The review particularly criticized Buchanan's claim that "[h]ad it not been for the West, African rulers would still be trafficking in the flesh of their kinsmen" as an example of dishonest historical revisionism.

Jonah Goldberg of the National Review:  First, let me say I both admire and dislike Buchanan's writing for the same reason: He brilliantly manages to do with one language what Yassir Arafat does with two. He offers red meat to the extremists while at the same giving himself the wiggle room to deny he said anything controversial in the first place. This is no mean feat.

The book's premise has been linked to the concept of Eurabia retrospectively by historian Niall Ferguson and by Voice of America. Buchanan's follow-up book State of Emergency made the Eurabia-association explicit.

See also

 America Alone
 Churchill, Hitler and the Unnecessary War
 Frankfurt School
 Opposition to immigration
 We Are Doomed
 White genocide conspiracy theory

References

External links
 The Death of the West at Archive.org  
 "Reviving the West" Review and Thoughts by Hans-Hermann Hoppe
 "'The Death of the West'" Review by Paul Gottfried
 "Buchanan and Market" Economics Review by Jeffrey A. Tucker
 The Death of the West Review by Thomas Dunne

2001 non-fiction books
Books by Patrick J. Buchanan
Conspiracist media
English-language books
Eurabia
Non-fiction books about immigration to the United States
Paleoconservative publications
St. Martin's Press books
White genocide conspiracy theory